Bedtime Stories is a 2008 American fantasy comedy film directed by Adam Shankman from a screenplay by Matt Lopez and Tim Herlihy based on a story by Lopez. It stars Adam Sandler in his first appearance in a family-oriented film alongside Keri Russell, Jonathan Morgan Heit, Laura Ann Kesling, Guy Pearce, Aisha Tyler, Russell Brand, Richard Griffiths, Teresa Palmer, Lucy Lawless and Courteney Cox. In the film, when a hotel handyman's stories to his niece and nephew come true, he keeps telling stories that become more outlandish. Sandler's production company Happy Madison and Andrew Gunn's company Gunn Films co-produced the film with Walt Disney Pictures.

The film was theatrically released on December 25, 2008, by Disney. Despite receiving generally negative reviews from critics, it was a box office success, earning $212.9 million against an $80 million budget.

Plot
In 1974, Skeeter and Wendy Bronson are raised by their father Marty at the family business: the Sunny Vista Motel. However, despite being a good hotelier and host, Marty faces serious financial problems with the business and almost goes bankrupt. The motel is sold into a forced liquidation to Barry Nottingham, CEO and founder of hotel chain Nottingham Hotels, and rebuilt into a luxury hotel named the Sunny Vista Nottingham. In the present day, Skeeter is stuck as the hotel's hardworking repairman, despite Nottingham previously promising the late Marty to let Skeeter run the hotel if he showed promise. Nottingham announces plans to close the old hotel in order to build a new one, named the Sunny Vista Mega Nottingham, and appoints the snotty Kendall Duncan as its future manager, simply because he is dating Nottingham's daughter Violet.

Wendy asks Skeeter to watch her children, Patrick and Bobbi, because the school at which she is the principal is closing down and she is looking for a job in Arizona. The first night, Skeeter cynically tells them a bedtime story in which he casts himself as an underdog peasant in a medieval fantasy world, who is unfairly passed over for promotion. Dissatisfied with the story’s unhappy ending, the children add that he at least gets a chance at the promotion, and that it starts raining gumballs.

The next day, the story miraculously comes true: Nottingham, recalling the original promise he made to Marty, gives Skeeter a shot at the manager position; and on his way home, gumballs rain on Skeeter from a truck crash on an overpass. The next night, at the hotel, Skeeter tells a wild west-style story in which he, as a cowboy, is freely given an expensive horse named Ferrari. Going out later that night, he saves Violet from obnoxious paparazzi; he then sees Violet’s Ferrari car and mistakenly thinks it is for him before Violet drives away. Skeeter realizes that only the children's additions to the stories come true. The night after that, Skeeter, with the children's help, tells a story about a chariot-riding stuntman in Ancient Greece who wins a date with the “fairest maiden in the land”. The next day, Skeeter ends up spending the day with and falling for his sister's friend and colleague Jill.

On Skeeter’s last night with the children, he tells them a space opera-style story in which he triumphs over Kendall in a duel, but the children add that someone kills him with a fireball as they want their story to be "real" since Skeeter had told them on their first night that happy endings don't exist in real life. Skeeter learns from Kendall that the new Nottingham Hotel will be at the location of the closing school. Skeeter and Kendall both make presentations on how best to market the hotel; with his heartfelt speech, Skeeter ultimately wins the managerial position. However, Skeeter, paranoid against fire due to the story, blasts a fire extinguisher at Nottingham's cake and is “fired”.

Skeeter, much to the surprise of Jill and Nottingham manages to get the hotel’s location moved to the beachfront in Santa Monica; after which Skeeter and Jill race to the school before it can be demolished. While at the site, protesting the school’s closure, Bobbi and Patrick sneak in the building to give their sign a better view. Skeeter and Jill arrive just in time to stop Kendall from setting off the highly sensitive explosives, saving the kids and the school. Sometime later, Skeeter marries Jill and opens a motel named after his father; with Kendall and his accomplice Aspen demoted to the motel's waiting staff. Violet marries Skeeter's best friend Mickey, giving him control of the Nottingham Empire. Nottingham quits the hotel industry to become a school nurse; and newlywed Skeeter and Jill have a baby boy.

Cast

Production
Director Adam Shankman describes Adam Sandler's character as "a sort of 'Cinderfella' character" and adds that "'He's like Han Solo ...'" It was filmed on various locations in California, including in Thousand Oaks where Mr. Nottingham's palace is set.

Music

The score to Bedtime Stories was composed by Rupert Gregson-Williams, who recorded his score with the Hollywood Studio Symphony at the Newman Scoring Stage at 20th Century Fox. The song "Don't Stop Believin'" is played during the film and during the end credits.

Theatrical release
The film was released in the United States on December 25, 2008, in Poland on January 23, 2009 and in Sweden on February 20, 2009.

Reception

Critical response

On Rotten Tomatoes Bedtime Stories has an approval rating of 27% based on 111 reviews, with an average rating of 4.4/10. The site's consensus states, "Though it may earn some chuckles from pre-teens, this kid-friendly Adam Sandler comedy is uneven, poorly paced, and lacks the requisite whimsy to truly work." On Metacritic the film has a weighted average score of 33 out of 100 based on 26 reviews, "generally unfavorable reviews". Audiences surveyed by CinemaScore gave the film a grade B+ on scale of A to F.

Box office
Slashfilm predicted that Bedtime Stories would open #1 during the December 25–28, 2008 Christmas weekend due to its family appeal and the box office draw of Adam Sandler, but it came at #3 grossing $38 million behind Marley & Me and The Curious Case of Benjamin Button. However, during the standard 3-day weekend, it jumped ahead of The Curious Case of Benjamin Button ranking #2 behind Marley & Me with $27.5 million. As of February 2009, the film had grossed $110,101,975 in the United States and Canada and  $102,772,467 in other countries, totaling $212,874,442 worldwide.

Home media
The film was released on Blu-ray Disc and DVD on April 7, 2009. The DVD was released as a single disc or a two-disc edition including behind-the-scenes featurette. Commercials advertising the discs feature background music recycled from the film Back to the Future Part III. As of November 1, 2009 the DVD has sold 2,835,662 copies generating $49,409,944 in sales revenue.

Accolades

Australian Film Institute 2009

BMI Film & TV Awards 2009

Kids' Choice Awards, USA 2009

Motion Picture Sound Editors, USA 2009

Young Artist Awards 2009

References

External links

 
 
 
 

2008 films
2000s fantasy comedy films
American fantasy comedy films
American films with live action and animation
2000s English-language films
2000s children's fantasy films
Films about mermaids
Walt Disney Pictures films
Films set in the 1970s
Films set in the 1980s
Films set in the 2000s
Magic realism films
Films about children
Films about families
Happy Madison Productions films
Films with screenplays by Tim Herlihy
Films directed by Adam Shankman
Films produced by Adam Sandler
Films scored by Rupert Gregson-Williams
American children's fantasy films
2008 comedy films
2000s American films